Your Favorite Band Live is a live album by Russian-American band Red Elvises.

Track listing

Credits

Recorded live on March 26, 1999 at the Great American Music Hall, San Francisco, CA.

Mixed and mastered at Shoobah-Doobah Studios by Oleg "Schramm" Gorbunov.

 Igor Yuzov - Vocals, guitar
 Oleg Bernov - Vocals, bass
 Zhenya Kolykhanov - Vocals, guitar
 Avi Sills - Drums

References

External links
 Official site

Red Elvises albums
2000 live albums